Sampson K. Dweh Jr. (born 10 October 2001) is a Liberian professional footballer who plays as a centre-back for MFK Vyškov and the Liberia national team.

References 

2001 births
Living people
Sportspeople from Monrovia
Liberian footballers
Association football central defenders
LPRC Oilers players
Liberian First Division players
Liberia international footballers
MFK Vyškov players
Czech National Football League players
Expatriate footballers in the Czech Republic
Liberian expatriate footballers
Liberian expatriate sportspeople in the Czech Republic